Play World Tour is a live video album by Taiwanese singer Jolin Tsai. It was released on January 30, 2018, by Warner and Eternal. The performances at the Taipei Arena in Taipei, Taiwan during May 22–25, 2015 were documented for the video release. The album only released physical format in Taiwan, and it topped the 2008 video album sales charts in the country.

Background and development 
On May 22, 2015, Tsai embarked on her fourth concert tour Play World Tour at Taipei Arena in Taipei, Taiwan. On November 17, 2015, the video release of the tour rumored to be finished recording. On September 30, 2016, Tsai as a representative of Asian artists attended the International Music Summit's Asia-Pacific event, and during a backstage interview she said that no plan for a live video album release for the Play World Tour. On December 24, 2016, Tsai attended the 10th Migu Music Awards, and in a backstage interview she confirmed that she would release a live video album for the Play World Tour in response to the great demand by music fans.

On April 11, 2017, Tsai's management company revealed on Sina Weibo that they have finished the rough cut for the concert video. On October 30, 2017, Sam Chen, the president of Warner Music Greater China, revealed on Facebook that the album would be released in December 2017, and he said that the album would be also released in Blu-ray format, becoming Tsai's first Blu-ray release. On December 12, 2017, Tsai confirmed that the album would be released in January 2018.

Release and promotion 
On December 23, 2017, Tsai announced that the album would be available for pre-order on January 3, 2018. It includes 29 live tracks, four We're All Difference, Yet the Same documentary films directed by Hou Chi-jan and Gavin Lin, and one behind-the-scenes footage. Warner confirmed that the video was recorded by 26 sets of ground and aerial camera, and more than 400 hours of source material have been distilled into a two-hour concert video.

On January 2, 2018, Tsai held a press conference for the album release at Lihpao Land in Taichung, Taiwan. On January 29, 2018, Tsai held the Double Play Fan Meeting to promote the album at the Taipei International Convention Center in Taipei, Taiwan. On January 29, 2018, the concert video was first broadcast on Line TV in Taiwan. On February 6, 2018, the concert video was broadcast on Tencent Video and Migu Music in China.

The album only released physical format in Taiwan, it peaked at number one on the weekly video album sales charts of Chia Chia, Eslite, Five Music, G-Music, Kuang Nan, PChome, Pok'elai, and YesAsia, and it topped the 2918 video album sales charts of Five Music, Kuang Nan, and Pok'elai.

Critical reception 
Taiwan's PlayMusic gave the album 4 out of 5 stars, and it commented that it was "another magnum opus of the Taiwan's pop diva, the costume, stage, and dance are refreshing, it showed us the high quality of C-pop music, as well as made people more look forward to Tsai's later work", adding that: "We can hear that Tsai's vocal has improved a lot compared with her previous few albums, in addition to her better breath support, Tsai's vocal expression, rhythm, and emotion became more vivid, she can now handle whether dance songs or ballads with more ease, and she performs with a lot more confidence, musically she re-arranged all the music for the show and made the whole show looks more smoothly."

Track listing 
The following is the track listing for the Blu-ray version, while the DVD version is divided into two discs, one for tracks 1 to 21 and one for tracks 22 to 34.

Personnel 

Live Shooting Crew:
 3 Aqua Entertainment Co. – post-production supervision
 Leo Hsu – executive production, direction
 Chenyeen Chen – supervisor
 Paul Kuo – video engineering supervision
 Ruya Cheng – assistant direction
 Jadee Li – assistant direction, production coordination
 Michelle Yang – assistant direction, production coordination
 Katie Lin – floor direction
 Jaguar Hung – floor direction
 Pao Lin – direction of photography, camera
 Chen Po-chuan – camera
 Liu Chun-hsin – camera
 Hu Yan-xun – camera
 Hime Li – production coordination
 Kate Lin – production coordination
 Mark Liu – production coordination
 Eva Chen – production administration
 Cindy Zhan – production administration
 Joan Lin – production administration
 Scott Lin – file management
 Noah's Ark Co. – equipment management
 Baishen Marketing Co. – GoPro camera

Behind the scenes:
 Leo Hsu – supervision, DVD/BD video production/edit
 Wen Chiu – behind the scenes filming supervision, behind the scenes camera
 Zhong Zhi-hong – behind the scenes camera
 Jiang Guo-ding – behind the scenes camera, Shanghai video engineering supervision
 Shanghai Top Solutions Advertising Co. – Shanghai equipment support
 Michelle Yang – executive production
 Li Li-rui – Japanese translation
 Mi Hsueh-er – English translation
 3 Aqua Entertainment Co. – DVD/BD video/animation rendering, DVD/BD menu animation design
 Kuo Hsing-yi – DVD/BD menu animation design
 Katie Lin – DVD/BD visual effects
 Jadee Li – DVD/BD visual effects

Others:
 Ian Lee – production, programming editor engineering
 Cherry Guns Factory Co., Ltd. – live recording
 AJ Chen – programming editor engineering
 Mega Force Studio – programming editor studio
 Kenny Fan – mixing engineering
 Yohu Studio – mixing studio
 Sun Chung-shu – mastering
 U-Tech Media Co. – DVD/BD video/audio mastering

Release history

References

External links 
 
 

2018 live albums
2018 video albums
Jolin Tsai live albums
Jolin Tsai video albums
Warner Music Taiwan live albums
Warner Music Taiwan video albums